The 5th parallel south is a circle of latitude that is 5 degrees south of the Earth's equatorial plane. It crosses the Atlantic Ocean, Africa, the Indian Ocean, Southeast Asia, Australasia, the Pacific Ocean and South America.

Around the world
Starting at the Prime Meridian and heading eastwards, the parallel 5° south passes through:

{| class="wikitable plainrowheaders"
! scope="col" width="125" | Co-ordinates
! scope="col" | Country, territory or sea
! scope="col" | Notes
|-
| style="background:#b0e0e6;" | 
! scope="row" style="background:#b0e0e6;" | Atlantic Ocean
| style="background:#b0e0e6;" |
|-
| 
! scope="row" | 
| For about 7 km
|-
| 
! scope="row" | 
| Cabinda exclave
|-valign="top"
| 
! scope="row" | 
|
|-
| style="background:#b0e0e6;" | 
! scope="row" style="background:#b0e0e6;" | Lake Tanganyika
| style="background:#b0e0e6;" |
|-
| 
! scope="row" | 
|
|-
| style="background:#b0e0e6;" | 
! scope="row" style="background:#b0e0e6;" | Indian Ocean
| style="background:#b0e0e6;" | Pemba Channel
|-
| 
! scope="row" | 
| Island of Pemba
|-valign="top"
| style="background:#b0e0e6;" | 
! scope="row" style="background:#b0e0e6;" | Indian Ocean
| style="background:#b0e0e6;" | Passing through the Amirante Islands,  Passing just south of Mahé island,  Passing just north of Peros Banhos atoll, 
|-
| 
! scope="row" | 
| Island of Sumatra
|-
| style="background:#b0e0e6;" | 
! scope="row" style="background:#b0e0e6;" | Java Sea
| style="background:#b0e0e6;" | Passing close by several small islands of 
|-
| 
! scope="row" | 
| Island of Sulawesi
|-
| style="background:#b0e0e6;" | 
! scope="row" style="background:#b0e0e6;" | Banda Sea
| style="background:#b0e0e6;" | Gulf of Boni - passing just north of the island of Kabaena, 
|-
| 
! scope="row" | 
| Islands of Muna and Buton
|-
| style="background:#b0e0e6;" | 
! scope="row" style="background:#b0e0e6;" | Banda Sea
| style="background:#b0e0e6;" | Passing close by several small islands of 
|-
| 
! scope="row" | 
| Island of New Guinea
|-
| 
! scope="row" | 
| Island of New Guinea
|-
| style="background:#b0e0e6;" | 
! scope="row" style="background:#b0e0e6;" | Pacific Ocean
| style="background:#b0e0e6;" | Bismarck Sea, passing close by several small islands of 
|-
| 
! scope="row" | 
| Island of New Britain
|-valign="top"
| style="background:#b0e0e6;" | 
! scope="row" style="background:#b0e0e6;" | Pacific Ocean
| style="background:#b0e0e6;" | Solomon Sea - Passing just south of the island of New Ireland,  - Passing just north of Buka Island,  An unnamed part of the ocean - Passing just north of Ontong Java Atoll,  - Passing just south of Nikumaroro atoll, 
|-
| 
! scope="row" | 
|Piura
|-
| 
! scope="row" | 
| For about 4 km at the southernmost point of the country
|-valign="top"
| 
! scope="row" | 
|Cajamarca Amazonas Loreto
|-valign="top"
| 
! scope="row" | 
| Amazonas Pará Maranhão Piauí Ceará Rio Grande do Norte
|-
| style="background:#b0e0e6;" | 
! scope="row" style="background:#b0e0e6;" | Atlantic Ocean
| style="background:#b0e0e6;" |
|}

See also
4th parallel south
6th parallel south

s05